This is the list of châteaux, which are located in Languedoc-Roussillon.

Aude 
 Château d'Aguilar, in Tuchan
 Château d'Albières, in Albières
 Château d’Arques, in Arques
 Château d'Auriac, in Auriac
 Château de Blanchefort, in Rennes-les-Bains
 Château de Bouisse, in Bouisse
 Château de Bugarach, in Bugarach
 Château de Camps-sur-l'Agly, in Camps-sur-l'Agly
Cité de Carcassonne, in Carcassonne
 Château de Castel d'Ase, in Soulatgé
 Château de Coustaussa, in Coustaussa
 Château de Cucugnan, in Cucugnan
 Château de Domneuve, in Tuchan
 Château de Durban-Corbières, in Durban-Corbières
 Château de Durfort, in Vignevieille
 Château de Fa, in Fa
 Tour Barberousse, in Gruissan
 Châteaux de Lastours, in Lastours (4 châteaux : Cabaret, Quertinheux, Surdespine and Tour Régine)
 Château de Montferrand, in Montferrand
 Château de Padern, in Padern
 Château de Paulignan, in Trausse
 Château de Peyrepertuse, in Duilhac-sous-Peyrepertuse
 Château de Pieusse, in Pieusse
 Château de Puilaurens, in Lapradelle-Puilaurens
 Château de Puivert, in Puivert
 Château de Quéribus, in Cucugnan
 Château de Quillan, in Quillan
 Château de Saissac, in Saissac
 Château de Saint-Ferriol, in Saint-Ferriol
 Château de Termes, in Termes
 Château de Villerouge la Crémade, in Fabrezan
 Château de Villerouge-Termenès, in Villerouge-Termenès

Gard 
Ramparts of Aigues-Mortes, in Aigues-Mortes
Château d'Allègre, in Allègre-les-Fumades
Cheylard d'Aujac, in Aujac
Château des Barbuts, in Saint-André-de-Valborgne
Château de Boissières, in Boissières
Château de Brésis, in Ponteils-et-Brésis
Château de Candiac, in Vestric-et-Candiac
Château d'Espeyran, in Saint-Gilles
Château de Générac, in Générac
Château de Mandajors, in Saint-Paul-la-Coste
Château de Montdardier, in Montdardier
Château de Pondres à Villevieille
Château de Portes, in Portes 
Fort Saint-André à Villeneuve-lès-Avignon
Château de Saint-Jean-du-Gard, in Saint-Jean-du-Gard
Château de Saint-Laurent-Le-Minier, in Saint-Laurent-le-Minier
Château d'Uzès, in Uzès
Château de Vissec, in Vissec

Hérault 
Château d'Aumelas, in Aumelas
Château de Bouloc, in Ceilhes-et-Rocozels
Château de Cabrières, in Cabrières
Château de Capion, in Gignac
Château de Castries, in Castries
Château de Dio-et-Valquières, in Dio-et-Valquières
Château du Géant, in Saint-Guilhem-le-Désert
Château des Guilhem, in Clermont-l'Hérault
Château de Lavagnac, in Montagnac
Château de Malavieille, in Mérifons
Château de Margon, in Margon
Château de Marsillargues, in Marsillargues
Château de Minerve, in Minerve
Château de la Mogère, in Montpellier
Château de Montferrand, in Saint-Mathieu-de-Tréviers
Château de Montplaisir, in Lodève
Château de Pézenas, in Pézenas
Château de Ribaute, in Lieuran-lès-Béziers
Château de Saint-Maurice, in Saint-Maurice-Navacelles
Château de Flaugergues, near Montpellier

Lozère

Pyrénées-Orientales

See also
 List of castles in France

 Languedoc-Roussillon